The 2011 FIFA Women's World Cup was the sixth FIFA Women's World Cup competition, the world championship for women's national association football teams. It was held from 26 June to 17 July 2011 in Germany, which won the right to host the event in October 2007. Japan won the final against the United States on a penalty shoot-out following a 2–2 draw after extra time and became the first Asian team to win a senior FIFA World Cup.

The matches were played in nine stadiums in nine host cities around the country, with the final played at the Commerzbank Arena in Frankfurt. Sixteen teams were selected for participation via a worldwide qualification tournament that began in 2009. In the first round of the tournament finals, the teams competed in round-robin groups of four teams for points, with the top two teams in each group proceeding. These eight teams advanced to the knockout stage, where two rounds of play decided which teams would participate in the final.

Host selection

Six nations, Australia, Canada, France, Germany, Peru and Switzerland, initially declared their interest in hosting the 2011 Women's World Cup. The German Football Association announced its hopes to host the tournament on 26 January 2006, following a pledge from German Chancellor Angela Merkel to fully support a potential bid. All six nations officially announced their interest by a 1 March 2007 deadline and acknowledged their intention of bidding by 3 May 2007 to FIFA.

The final bidding dossiers had to be handed over before 1 August 2007. Switzerland withdrew on 29 May 2007, stating that Europe is heavily focused on France and Germany, and a third European bid appeared futile. On 27 August 2007, France also withdrew, reportedly in exchange for Germany's support for their bid to host the men's UEFA Euro 2016. Later Australia (12 October 2007) and Peru (17 October 2007) voluntarily dropped out of the race as well, leaving only Canada and Germany as the remaining candidates. On 30 October 2007, the FIFA Executive Committee voted to assign the tournament to Germany. Canada was eventually awarded the 2015 Women's World Cup four years later.

Upon the selection, Germany became the third country to host both men's and women's World Cup, having hosted the men's twice in 1974 and 2006.

Venues
After the German Football Association (DFB) expressed its intention to bid for the Women's World Cup, 23 German cities applied to host World Cup games. Twelve cities were chosen for the official bidding dossier handed over to FIFA in August 2007. On 30 September 2008, the DFB executive committee decided to use nine stadiums for the tournament; the original candidates Essen, Magdeburg and Bielefeld were not chosen as World Cup venues.

The official opening game was held between Germany and Canada at the Olympic Stadium in Berlin, the venue of the 2006 men's World Cup Final; it was the only match played in Berlin. However, it was not the first match of the tournament—it was preceded by a match at Rhein-Neckar-Arena in Sinsheim pitting France and Nigeria. The final of the tournament took place at the Commerzbank-Arena in Frankfurt, the venue of the 2005 men's Confederations Cup final. Borussia-Park in Mönchengladbach and Frankfurt's Commerzbank-Arena hosted the semi-finals. The third place play-off was held at Rhein-Neckar-Arena.

Since 2007, five of the stadiums were either newly built (Augsburg, Dresden and Sinsheim) or remodelled (Bochum and Leverkusen). Six stadiums would be home grounds for German First Bundesliga clubs in the upcoming 2011–12 season, while the other three would be home to Second Bundesliga clubs in the same season. Compared to the 2006 men's World Cup, several smaller venues were chosen; six stadiums have a capacity of 20,000 to 30,000 seats. All cities would stage a total of four matches, with the exceptions of Berlin and Mönchengladbach; the latter would host three games. The total capacity of the nine venues is roughly 330,000. Overall, approximately one million tickets would be available.

Several of the stadiums were officially referred to simply as "FIFA Women's World Cup Stadium" because FIFA prohibited sponsorship of stadiums unless the stadium sponsors were also official tournament sponsors. With no standing-room terraces allowed, all stadiums had a lower total capacity compared to German Bundesliga games. Capacity data is given according to FIFA:

Teams and qualification

Number of participating teams
FIFA had considered the prospect of increasing the number of teams from 16 to 24, to reflect the growing global popularity of women's football and the Women's World Cup. However, on 14 March 2008, the FIFA Executive Committee decided to keep the number of participants at 16, concerned that more teams would dilute the quality of play. The idea of having 20 teams taking part, which had been discussed briefly, was ruled impossible to implement in terms of fixture planning and logistics. During the 2007 Women's World Cup, FIFA president Sepp Blatter had campaigned for the idea to increase the number of teams, although this proposal was not unquestioned. In particular the 11–0 victory of Germany over Argentina in the opening game of the 2007 tournament had caused a debate over whether there were 24 national teams on a comparable level.

Confederation allocation
In October 2008, the FIFA Executive Committee announced a change to the allocation of the qualifying berths for its continental confederations. Asia was granted 3 automatic berths instead of 2.5 for the finals (although in 2007 the host nation was an additional qualifier from Asia). Europe's allocation was reduced from 5 to 4.5 (although it effectively increased to 5.5 because of the automatic qualification of the host nation). The North/Central American and Caribbean confederation (CONCACAF) retained their 2.5 qualifiers, Africa and South America 2 each, and Oceania 1. The 16th qualifying spot was determined through a play-off between the third-placed team in CONCACAF and the winner of repechage play-offs in Europe.

FIFA also ruled that each confederation has to ensure that at least one third of its member associations enter their women's national teams for World Cup qualification, otherwise FIFA would re-examine the current slot allocation. In Africa and the Middle East a considerable percentage of teams had withdrawn from World Cup qualification in the past.

For European teams, the 2011 Women's World Cup was also used as a qualification tournament for the 2012 Summer Olympics. Besides Team Great Britain, Europe had two additional qualifiers for the Summer Olympics.  With Germany losing their quarter-final, France, which had already reached the semi-finals, secured qualification to the Olympics. Sweden followed as UEFA's second team with its win against Australia.

Qualified teams

Qualification for the tournament took place between April 2009 and November 2010. As the host nation, Germany were granted automatic qualification, while the remaining national teams qualified through their continental confederations. Most confederations used their continental championship tournaments – the AFC Women's Asian Cup, CAF Women's Championship, OFC Women's Championship, Sudamericano Femenino and CONCACAF Women's Gold Cup – to determine qualification. The exception to this was UEFA, which used its own qualifying tournament. One qualification spot was determined by a play-off between a UEFA and CONCACAF team.

AFC (3)
 
 
 
CAF (2)
 
 
CONCACAF (3)
 
 
 †

CONMEBOL (2)
 
 
OFC (1)
 
UEFA (5)
 
 
  (Host Nation)
 
 

† – qualified via a play-off against Italy

Colombia and Equatorial Guinea made their debuts in the FIFA Women's World Cup. Brazil, Germany, Japan, Nigeria, Norway, Sweden and the United States maintained their streak of qualifying for all six tournaments so far, while China PR failed to qualify for the first time ever. This is Mexico's first appearance since 1999 and France's first appearance since 2003.

Organization

Local organising committee

The tournament is supervised by the "Women's World Cup 2011 Organising Committee Germany". President of the Organising Committee (OC) is former German international Steffi Jones; she started her work on 1 January 2008. German president Christian Wulff was named the patron of the tournament.

The Organising Committee is chaired by Jones and supervised by the board of the German Football Federation (DFB). On 25 January 2009, Jones opened the committee offices and named her OC team. It is led by managing director Uli Wolter, who headed the Leipzig branch during the 2006 men's World Cup. Aside from Wolter, four department heads were named. Heike Ulrich is responsible for the tournament organisation, former German international Doris Fitschen heads the marketing department, Winfried Naß leads the department "Cities and Stadiums", and Jens Grittner, who served as the press officer for the 2006 Organising Committee, heads the communications department.

Intended to advertise the tournament primarily in Germany, the Organising Committee named four national Women's World Cup ambassadors: former German internationals Britta Carlson, Renate Lingor, and Sandra Minnert, as well as shooting Paralympics gold medallist Manuela Schmermund. In October 2009, former U.S. international Mia Hamm was presented as the World Cup's international ambassador. Each host city except for Berlin also named two city ambassadors. They include footballers Matthias Sammer, Karl-Heinz Riedle and Rainer Bonhof, fencer Britta Heidemann or biathlete Magdalena Neuner.

Emblem and mascot

The official World Cup emblem, called Arena Deutschland, was presented by Steffi Jones and Franz Beckenbauer in the break between the women's and the men's game of the German Cup final on 19 April 2008. It shows a stylised stadium with stripes in the national colours of Germany, black, red and gold, and a pictogram of the Women's World Cup trophy in the upper right corner. It was designed by the Stuttgart advertising agency WVP.

The tournament mascot, cat "Karla Kick", was presented during the opening game of the 2010 Under-20 Women's World Cup on 13 July 2010. The mascot was developed by the Frankfurt agency GMR Marketing. According to Jones, the mascot represents "important attributes of women's football: passion, fun and dynamics".

Tickets
Approximately one million tickets were available in total, with 900,000 on general sale. 350,000 tickets were offered at discount prices, mainly intended for families, clubs and schools, one of the key target groups of the Organising Committee. As of 22 June 2011, 700,000 tickets have been sold.

The World Cup tickets were offered in several sales phases. During the first sales period from 29 October 2009 to 31 August 2010, only so-called city series tickets were offered. Each city series includes tickets for all games of that particular host city. The prices ranged from €30 to €415. In the second sales period from 17 February to 31 August 2010, so-called 20Eleven tickets were sold to groups of at least 11 people, offered at a 20 percent discount and directed primarily at schools and clubs. Single tickets for all matches were first sold starting 15 September 2010. The prices of individual tickets range from €10 to €200. On 18 March 2011, 100 days before the opening game, the last sales phase started, with all remaining tickets being sold in the order in which orders are received.

Unlike tickets at the 2006 men's World Cup in Germany, the tickets for the Women's World Cup were not personalised. The same city series ticket can be used by different people for different games.

Budget and sponsors

The tournament's budget has been set at €51 million. The German Football Association plans to cover these costs in almost equal parts from ticket sales and from sponsors, primarily from six so-called National Supporters. In order for the tournament to break even, the DFB has said about 80% of the tickets need to be sold, which would translate to an average attendance of 25,000. The DFB estimates to earn roughly €27 million through the general ticket sale.

From 2008 to 2010, the six National Supporters were presented: the tele-communications company Deutsche Telekom, the bank Commerzbank, the insurer Allianz, the retailer Rewe, the national mail company Deutsche Post and the national railway company Deutsche Bahn. Aside from Deutsche Bahn, the sponsors are identical with those of the 2010 U-20 Women's World Cup.

Media coverage
The television coverage of the tournament was unprecedented. For the first time, all matches were produced in high definition, with in-goal cameras and two steadicams being used for all matches. For selected matches, the broadcast production comprised up to 18 cameras, including a spidercam and a helicopter camera.

In Germany the public broadcasters ARD and ZDF showed all 32 tournament games live. Across Europe, all games were available on Eurosport in 34 countries and territories. In the United States, ESPN and ESPN2 served as the official English-language broadcaster, while Univision carried coverage in Spanish. In Canada, CBC Television and Sportsnet broadcast the tournament; the event was the first in a sub-licensing partnership for FIFA tournaments between the two networks. In the United Kingdom, the games of the England national team were shown live by BBC Red Button and the BBC Sport website. The final was shown live on BBC Three. SBS held the broadcasting rights for Australia, while Al Jazeera broadcast matches in the Middle East and North Africa.

The tournament was the first women's event to be the subject of a Panini sticker album, available only in Germany.

The final match between Japan and the United States broke the record for most tweets per second on Twitter – 7,196.

Match officials
FIFA's Referees' Committee selected 16 referees to officiate at the World Cup: three from the AFC, one from the CAF, two from CONMEBOL, three from CONCACAF, one from the OFC and six from UEFA. In addition 32 assistant referees and three fourth officials were selected. The oldest referee was 42-year-old Swede Jenny Palmquist, while the youngest referee was 29-year-old Finau Vulvuli of Fiji.

Squads

As with the 2007 tournament, each team's squad for the 2011 Women's World Cup consisted of 21 players, two less than men's World Cup squads. Each participating national association had to confirm their final 21-player squad no later than 10 working days before the start of the tournament. Replacement of seriously injured players was permitted until 24 hours before the team in question's first World Cup game.

Doping cases
On 25 June 2011 the A sample of Yineth Varón, goalkeeper of Colombia, tested positive to an as yet unknown substance. She was provisionally suspended by the FIFA until the B sample result was known. On 25 August 2011, it was confirmed that she had received a two-year ban.

On 7 July 2011, FIFA announced that two players from North Korea, Song Jong-Sun and Jong Pok-Sim, were provisionally suspended prior to their team's match against Colombia after failing doping tests during the tournament. On 16 July, FIFA announced that three additional players (Hong Myong-Hui, Ho Un-Byol and Ri Un-Hyang) from North Korea tested positive following target testing of the whole team. On 25 August 2011, the Korean team was fined 400,000, which is equal to the prize it received by finishing 13th in the 2011 tournament, and was excluded from participation at the 2015 FIFA Women's World Cup.

Final draw
The Organising Committee approved the procedure for the final draw on 28 November 2010. Four teams from different geographic regions – Germany, Japan, United States, Brazil – were seeded based on their FIFA Women's World Rankings. No two teams from the same confederation were to be drawn in the same group, with the exception of Group A, which would include two European teams.

The group draw was staged in Frankfurt, Germany, on 29 November 2010 at the Congress Centrum. The ceremony was presented by Organising Committee president Steffi Jones, assisted by FIFA Head of Women's Competitions Tatjana Haenni. The balls were drawn by former German international Günter Netzer and Slovak model and women's football ambassador Adriana Karembeu.

Group stage
The first round, or group stage, sees the sixteen teams divided into four groups of four teams. Each group is a round-robin of six games, where each team plays one match against each of the other teams in the same group. Teams are awarded three points for a win, one point for a draw and none for a defeat. The teams finishing first and second in each group qualifies for the quarter-finals.

The match schedule for the tournament was released on 20 March 2009, with the hosts placed in position A1. Unlike previous Women's World Cup final tournaments, there were no double-headers, but matches on the same day were held in different venues. According to the Organising Committee, this "signals the increased quality and status of the women's finals".

All times are in the CEST time zone (UTC+2).

Group A

Group B

Group C

Group D

Knockout stage

The knockout stage comprises the eight teams that advanced from the group stage of the tournament. There are three rounds of matches, with each round eliminating half of the teams entering that round. The successive rounds are the quarter-finals, semi-finals, and the final. There is also a play-off to decide third and fourth place. For each game in the knockout stage, any draw at 90 minutes is followed by thirty minutes of extra time; if scores are still level, there is a penalty shootout to determine who progresses to the next round.

Bracket

Quarter-finals

Semi-finals

Third place play-off

Final

Awards

The following awards were given at the conclusion of the tournament. The Golden Ball (best overall player), Golden Boot (top scorer) and Golden Glove (best goalkeeper) awards were sponsored by Adidas, while the Best Young Player award was sponsored by Hyundai Motor Company. FIFA.com shortlisted ten goals for users to vote on as the Goal of the Tournament, which was sponsored by Sony.

All-Star Team

Statistics

Goalscorers

Assists

Tournament ranking

See also
 2006 FIFA World Cup
 FIFA Women's World Cup
 FIFA Women's World Rankings
 FIFA World Cup
 Germany in 2011

References

External links

FIFA Women's World Cup Germany 2011, FIFA.com
Organising Committee Germany 
FIFA Technical Report
FIFA Physical Analysis

 
2010–11 in German women's football
2011 in women's association football
2011
2011
Football at the 2012 Summer Olympics – Women's qualification
June 2011 sports events in Germany
July 2011 sports events in Germany